Ritson's Northern Garlands , Edited and published by Joseph Ritson, is a compilation of four previously published books on North East music, published in 1810.

Details 
 Ritson's Northern Garlands 1810  (or to give it its full title - “Northern Garlands -- The Bishopric Garland or Durham Minstrel; A choice collection of excellent songs -- The Yorkshire Garland; A curious collection of old and new songs -- The Northumberland Garland or Newcastle Nightingale; A matchless collection of famous songs -- The North-Country Chorister; An unparalleled variety of excellent songs -- Edited by the late Joseph Ritson, Esq -- London; Printed for R. Triphook, St. Jame's Street; By Harding and Wright, St. John' Square – 1810”)  is a book of North East of England folk songs consisting of approximately 100 pages, published in 1810.

Joseph Ritson’s Northern Garland is a compilation of the 4 volumes of songs published in the late 18th and early 19th century. The four separate volumes are as follows :-
The Bishopric Garland or Durham Minstrell (note the mis-spelling in the forward to the collection) which first appeared in 1784, and again in 1792 in a slightly corrected and expanded form, with a reprint in 1809
The Yorkshire Garland which first appeared as part I in 1788 (however part II never appeared). A further edition was reprinted in 1809.
The Northumberland Garland or Newcastle Nightingale first appeared in 1793, reprinted in 1809 - and
The North-Country Chorister first appeared 1802, reprinted in 1809.
The compilation with the collective title of “The Northern Garland” was published in 1810.

It is only an important document in its own right, but one of the main sources of similar successor publications such as John Bell's Rhymes of Northern Bards and Bruce and Stokoe's Northumbrian Minstrelsy.

A set of original documents are held in The Robinson Library of Newcastle University

The publication 
The front cover of the book was as thus :-

Northern Garlands	
- - - - - - -<br/ >	
THE		
BISHOPRIC GARLANDS
OR		
DURHAM MINSTREL	
A choice Collection of excellent Songs
- - - - - - -<br/ >	
THE		
YORKSHIRE GARLAND; 
A curious Collection of old and new Songs
- - - - - - -<br/ >	
THE		
NORTHUMBERLAND GARLAND
OR		
NEWCASTLE NIGHTINGALE; 
A matchless Collection of famous Songs
- - - - - - -<br/ >	
THE		
NORTH-COUNTRY CHORISTER; 
An unparalleled Variety of excellent Songs
- - - - - - -<br/ >	
EDITED BY THE LATE	
JOSEPH RITSON, ESQ	
- - - - - - -<br/ >	
LONDON; 		
PRINTED FOR R. TRIPHOOK, ST. JAME'S-STREET; 
By Harding and Wright, St. John'-square
- - - - - - -<br/ >	
1810

Contents 
The compilation book is set out as follows:-<br/ >

front cover<br/ >
Several blank pages<br/ >
An article headed  “Advertisement” which is a preface detailing the books and their editor<br/ >
This is followed by the four separate sections, each with their own songs, poems, comments, etc., 
 Part I The Bishoprick Garland or Durham Minstrel,
 Part II The Yorkshire Garland,
 Part III The Northumberland Garland, and
 Part IV The North-Country Chorister,
each section with its own index/contents page except Part III.

See also 
 Geordie dialect words
 Joseph Ritson
 Ritson's Bishopric Garland or Durham Minstrel 1792
 Ritson's Yorkshire Garland 1809
 Ritson's Northumberland Garland or Newcastle Nightingale 1809
 Ritson's North-Country Chorister 1809

References

External links
 Farne archives - front cover
 Allan’s Illustrated Edition of Tyneside songs and readings - page 512
 Google e-book Northern Garland
 Google e-book

English folk songs
Books by Joseph Ritson
Songs related to Newcastle upon Tyne
1810 songs
Northumbrian folklore
Geordie songwriters
Chapbooks